Kostanay is a city located on the Tobol River in northern Kazakhstan. It was known as Nikolayevsk until 1895 and then as Kustanay until 1997. Kostanay is the administrative center of the Kostanay Region. As of 24 March 2022, the city's governor is Marat Zhundubayev.

History
Kostanay was founded by Russian settlers in 1879 and named Nikolaevsk, in honor of Tsar Nicholas II. In 1888, the town had more than 3,000 inhabitants involved in the building of a mill and a brewery, which are still operational. In 1893, Kustanay was granted city status. The Red Army took control in 1918 and changed the city's name to Kustanay. The Kustanay Region was established in 1936 with its administrative center in Kustanay. Six years after fall of Soviet Union, Kazakhstan renamed it to Kostanay. In 2009, the city population was

Geographic location
The city is located in the steppe zone in the north of the Turgay plateau, in the south-eastern part of the West Siberian Plain, on the Tobol River, 571 km north-west of Astana city (704 km along the highway). The nearest city with at least a million inhabitants is Chelyabinsk in Russia, located 260 km north-west of Kostanay.

Public institutions
In Kostanay, there are five institutions of higher education. There are also 22 high schools, which educate over 12,200 students. The state network of culture lists 381 libraries, 201 club establishments, 8 museums, and 2 theatres. Athletic facilities include 2 sports arenas, 26 stadiums, 10 sports complexes and 567 sports halls.

Climate
Kostanay has a warm-summer humid continental climate (Köppen climate classification: Dfb), with very warm, dry summers and frigid, snowy winters. The average annual humidity is 71 percent and the growing season averages about 170 days.

Culture

Kostanay has a rich historical-cultural heritage. The regional center includes a Sunni mosque, the Regional Administration Building, Kostanay State University, the Kostanay Regional Memorial Museum of Altynsarin, the Kazakh Drama Theatre, Central Square and a railway station. Historical monuments include the Ybyrai Altynsarin monument, the Akhmet Baitursynov monument, a memorial dedicated to victims of the Second World War, the "Execution wall" (where Alexander Kolchak's army officers were executed by Red Army soldiers), and the Alexander Pushkin monument.

The city has 173 monuments of historical and cultural significance. Of these, 3 are of republican significance, 48 local, 25 obelisks and busts and 97 memorial plaques.[3]

Transportation

Kostanay is connected by road with the following cities in Russia: Chelyabinsk, Magnitogorsk, Troitsk, Yekaterinburg, Kurgan and Tyumen. It is also connected to Kokshetau, Astana and Almaty in Kazakhstan. Fifty-three railway stations carry passengers and cargo from the city. Oil is delivered by rail from Russia as well as oil refineries in Kazakhstan.

Kostanay International Airport handles common and charter flights to many cities in Kazakhstan, former Soviet republics, Germany (Frankfurt and Hanover), the United Arab Emirates, Turkey, and other countries. The airport also functions as a local port of entry and customs checkpoint.

Sport
Kostanay is home to the FC Tobol football club, based in the Kostanay Central Stadium, which participates in the Kazakhstan Super League. Kostanay also has a basketball team, BK Tobol Kostanay, which participates in the Kazakhstan Basketball Cup. The city has an ice rink for winter sports, and in 2016, a team participated in the national bandy championship in Khromtau for junior players born in 1999–2000.

Notable people
 

Syrbai Maulenov (1922–1993), Kazakhstan poet

Twin towns – sister cities

Kostanay is twinned with:
 Kirklees, England, United Kingdom

References

External links
Photos of Kostanay

Cities and towns in Kazakhstan
Populated places established in 1879
Populated places in Kostanay Region
Kustanaysky Uyezd